Palauan may refer to:

 Something of, from, or related to Palau
 Palauan language, which originated in Palau, and its various dialects and accents
 Palauan people, a nation and ethnic group identified with Palau
 Palauan passport, a document that is issued to Palauan citizens

Language and nationality disambiguation pages